Buddy of the Apes is a 1934 Warner Bros. Looney Tunes cartoon, the first supervised by Ben Hardaway. The short was released on May 26, 1934, and stars Buddy, the second star of the series.

Summary
Buddy, dressed in a leopard pelt and wearing his ordinary shoes, steps from his house amid the jungle trees, thumps his chest, and utters a great yell before swinging from tree to tree down to the earth. Cleverly, he washes himself with the water of an elephant's trunk, steps behind the great beast to wring out his raiment, then, when again decent, re-emerges. Buddy steps over to a nearby pond, where he brushes his teeth with a reed thereby growing. We see animals doing similar things: a giraffe rinses its mouth and spits, an alligator cleans its dentures with a porcupine, and a monkey flosses the teeth of a hippopotamus. A mother ape rocks her baby in a cradle (balanced on a ledge), and gives him a coconut as a bottle; when the child looks to be safely asleep, the mother steps away. But the child is awake, and he happily rocks himself off of his precarious ledge, and falls, cradle and all, into a river below: the mother returns screaming.

Buddy, meanwhile, slices open a coconut to drink its milk, and the mother ape hysterically enjoins his help in rescuing her baby. Buddy rushes off, and, cleverly tying the hilt of his coconut knife to a vine, he snags the little ape's cradle and barely saves the infant from falling down a rushing waterfall. The mother scolds her baby upon his return, and Buddy and several other creatures dance in a circle (Buddy at center). A native from a nearby village catches sight of the triumphant party by means of a spy-glass and hurries back to tell his Chief of the matter: the village gathers, the Chief speaks in a language accessible only to himself and his people up until the last few words which are "Go get'em!!", and most of the villagers arm and hurry off at this command, whilst two stay behind to take up the king's litter.

Buddy, interrupted from a game that he was apparently playing with an ape friend of his, deftly escapes two spears from the advancing local enemy (the ape on his back), and leaps to his hut, again uttering a great bellow: this is a gathering cry for the beasts of the jungle. An elephant hears Buddy, sees the enemies, and gathers, with its trunk, acorns, which then it fires, to great effect, at the natives. Buddy catches a spear in his teeth, fires it back at its thrower, and catches the native, by his nose ring, on a tree. A kangaroo then emerges and punches the trapped enemy, while a smaller native kicks the belly of the beast, from which, naturally enough, emerges a baby kangaroo, which then takes a mighty and successful swing at the tiny belligerent. Apes load coconuts into a hippopotamus, and another ape swings from a tree to kick the beast, which then, by mouth, launches the palm projectiles at quickly frightened, retreating natives. Dodging most, the fleeing warriors are struck from the rear by one, and, as they are running in a straight line, are bunched together at once, and thrown thus off a cliff, into the water beneath. A monkey emerges from the beak of a pelican and fires coconuts at the tribal chief and his litter-bearers, knocking out the two servants and sending the chief flying; the hippopotamus continues to fire coconuts and hits the Chief numerous times. Another ape successfully uses a cat as a bow from which to fire long needles at the Chief's behind. Buddy, watching, swings down from his hut and catches his enemy by the neck. Wrestling the Chief into submission, Buddy again lets loose his jungle roar and is outfitted with the same crown worn, not a moment ago, by the defeated native chief.

References

External links
 Buddy of the Apes (low quality) on Dailymotion

1934 films
1934 animated films
American black-and-white films
Films scored by Bernard B. Brown
Films scored by Norman Spencer (composer)
Films directed by Ben Hardaway
Buddy (Looney Tunes) films
Films set in jungles
Looney Tunes shorts
Warner Bros. Cartoons animated short films
1930s Warner Bros. animated short films